Zach Eckersley (born 10 November 2003) is a professional rugby league footballer who plays as a  for the London Broncos in the RFL Championship, on short-term loan from the Wigan Warriors in the Betfred Super League.

Playing Career

Wigan Warriors
In 2022 Eckersley made his Super League début for Wigan against Hull Kingston Rovers.

London Broncos (loan)
On 10 Feb 2023 it was announced he would join the London Broncos on an initial one month loan.

References

External links
Wigan Warriors profile

2003 births
Living people
English rugby league players
London Broncos players
Rugby league centres
Wigan Warriors players